Volleyball events were contested at the 2005 Summer Universiade in İzmir, Turkey.

References
 Universiade volleyball medalists on HickokSports

Universiade
2005 Summer Universiade
2005